Fred Irvin Lamson was an American politician who served as Mayor of Malden, Massachusetts and was a member of the Massachusetts Senate.

Early life
Lamson was born on December 11, 1910, in Stonington, Maine. He graduated from Everett High School in Everett, Massachusetts. In 1934 he opened Lamson and Davis Hardware with his father-in-law.

Politics
Lamson served on the Malden Common Council from 1940 to 1941. He then served as an Alderman until 1943 when he unsuccessfully challenged incumbent John D. McCarthy for the mayoralty. In 1944 he was elected to the Massachusetts House of Representatives. The following year he once again lost to McCarthy in the mayors race. In 1947 he defeated McCarthy 8720 votes to 8042. He remained Mayor until 1957.

From 1953 to 1973, Lamson represented the 4th Middlesex District in the Massachusetts Senate. He was the Senate Minority Leader from 1959 to 1963.

Death
Lamson died on December 24, 1981, in Malden Hospital.

See also
 1945–1946 Massachusetts legislature
 1947–1948 Massachusetts legislature
 1955–1956 Massachusetts legislature

References

1910 births
1981 deaths
Republican Party Massachusetts state senators
Mayors of Malden, Massachusetts
Republican Party members of the Massachusetts House of Representatives
Politicians from Everett, Massachusetts
20th-century American politicians
People from Stonington, Maine